Bart Van Lancker (17 March 1973 – 23 June 2021) was a Belgian professional football coach and holder of a PRO LICENSE diploma who mainly worked as assistant manager and physical coach in Belgium, who also managed Kortrijk for one season.

Managerial career
Bart Van Lancker was appointed the manager of Kortrijk. Previously he was the assistant coach at KSV Cercle Brugge and KMSK Deinze. In his last years he was physical coach in KFCO Beerschot Wilrijk and STVV.

References

External links
Van Lancker World Ranking
Van Lancker L'Equipe Profile

1973 births
2021 deaths
Belgian footballers
Belgian football managers
K.V. Kortrijk managers
Association footballers not categorized by position
Oud-Heverlee Leuven non-playing staff
People from Zottegem
Place of death missing
Sportspeople from East Flanders